Yago Del Piero (born 14 January 1994) is a Brazilian professional footballer who plays as a midfielder.

Career
Born in Brazil, Del Piero traveled to Italy at a young age. He was a member of Treviso youth team.

Internazionale
On 1 September 2008, he was signed by Internazionale for undisclosed fee, then champions of Serie A and the reserves. On the same day, Daniel Maa Boumsong joined Treviso outright for an additional €250,000 fee.

Del Piero was a member of Inter's under-18 team in 2011–12 Campionato Nazionale Dante Berretti season and under-19 team in 2012–13 Campionato Nazionale Primavera season. Del Piero also played few friendlies for Inter first team in 2012.

Cesena
On 30 January 2013, Del Piero left for Cesena on a temporary basis with an option to purchase half of the registration rights. In June 2013 Cesena exercised the option for €250,000 fee on a three-year contract. That month also saw Inter bought back Luca Caldirola, making the club purchased Del Piero by counter-weight part the payable received from Inter. In July Del Piero, along with Saša Čičarević and Marco Paolini left for San Marino Calcio in temporary deal from Cesena.

Del Piero made his debut in the second match of the league cup. Paolini also played the first match of the league. In June 2014 Cesena signed him outright for free, which the club also registered a special income of €250,000, due to the cancellation of the payable to Inter for the second half of the player's registration rights.

Circa summer 2015 Cesena released Del Piero for free (one year earlier than his original contract). The club also registered an accounting loss of €166,667, the residual accounting value of the player.

References

Brazilian footballers
Treviso F.B.C. 1993 players
Inter Milan players
A.C. Cesena players
A.S.D. Victor San Marino players
Serie C players
Association football midfielders
Brazilian people of Italian descent
1994 births
Living people